National Highway 333A, commonly referred to as NH 333A is a national highway in  India. It is a spur road of National Highway 33. NH-333A traverses the states of Bihar and Jharkhand in India.

Route 

 Bihar

Barbigha - Shekhpura, Sikandra, Jamui, Jha-Jha, Banka - Jharkhand Border.

 Jharkhand

Bihar Border- Godda, Suderpahari, Litipara, Pakur.

Junctions  

  Terminal near Barbigha.
  near Jamui.
  near Godda.
  Terminal near Pakur.

See also 

 List of National Highways in India
 List of National Highways in India by state

References

External links 

 NH 333A on OpenStreetMap

National highways in India
National Highways in Bihar
National Highways in Jharkhand